Edward J. "Ed" Liddie (born July 21, 1959 in Union City, Georgia) is an American former judoka. He represented his native country at the 1984 Summer Olympics in Los Angeles, California and was the bronze medalist in the men's extra-lightweight division (– 60 kg). He also won judo medals at the Pan American Games in 1979 and 1991. He graduated from Cumberland College in 1983.   He teaches at the United States Olympic Training Center in Colorado Springs, Colorado. He was named as a finalist for the USOC Paralympic Coach of the Year in 2013. He served as a coach for some Olympic judoka such as Taraje Williams-Murray.

References

External links
  Profile
 

1959 births
Living people
American male judoka
Judoka at the 1984 Summer Olympics
Olympic judoka of the United States
Olympic bronze medalists for the United States in judo
Sportspeople from Fulton County, Georgia
Judoka trainers
Medalists at the 1984 Summer Olympics
Pan American Games silver medalists for the United States
Pan American Games bronze medalists for the United States
Pan American Games medalists in judo
Judoka at the 1979 Pan American Games
Judoka at the 1991 Pan American Games
Medalists at the 1979 Pan American Games
Medalists at the 1991 Pan American Games
20th-century American people